This is an incomplete list of some of the manuscripts from the Cotton library that today form the Cotton collection of the British Library. Some manuscripts were destroyed or damaged in a fire at Ashburnham House in 1731, and a few are kept in other libraries and collections.

Counterclockwise, these were Julius Caesar, Augustus, Cleopatra, Faustina, Tiberius, Caligula, Claudius, Nero, Galba, Otho, Vitellius, Vespasian, Titus, and Domitian. (Domitian had only one shelf, perhaps because it was over the door). In each press, each shelf was assigned a letter; manuscripts were identified by the bust over the press, the shelf letter, and the position of the manuscript (in Roman numerals) counting from the left side of the shelf. Thus, the Lindisfarne Gospels, Nero B.iv, was the fourth manuscript from the left on the second shelf (shelf B) of the press under the bust of Nero. For Domitian and Augustus, which had only one shelf each, the shelf letter was left out of the press-mark. The British Museum retained Cotton's press-marks when the Cotton collection became one of the foundational collections of its library, so manuscripts are still designated by library, bookpress, shelf, and number (even though they are no longer stored in that fashion). For example, the manuscript of Beowulf is designated Cotton MS Vitellius A.xv, and the manuscript of Pearl is Cotton MS Nero A.x.

Augustus

Caligula

Claudius

Cleopatra

Domitian

Faustina

Galba

Julius

Nero

Otho

Tiberius

Titus

Vespasian

Vitellius

Notes

References

Further reading

Cotton

British literature-related lists